Robert Patrick Smith (31 August 1922 – 27 March 1992) was an Irish soccer player during the 1940s.

Smith played for Bohemians during the 1940s in the League of Ireland and was a member of the 1945 Bohemian Inter City Cup winning team against Belfast Celtic at Dalymount Park. Smith joined a select group when he represented Ireland at the 1948 Olympic Games and scored a flying header against the Netherlands in the preliminary round. In 1951, he moved to Canada to join Toronto East End Canadians of the National Soccer League.

Honours
Inter City Cup
 Bohemians – 1945
Represented Ireland at the 1948 Summer Olympic Games

References

External links

Smith at the 1948 Olympic Games

Republic of Ireland association footballers
League of Ireland players
Bohemian F.C. players
Footballers at the 1948 Summer Olympics
Olympic footballers of Ireland
1922 births
1992 deaths
Association football forwards